For the 1990–91 West Ham United F.C. season in English football, West Ham United finished 2nd in the league.

Season summary

Billy Bonds in his first full season as manager guided West Ham back to the top flight of The Football League as the team finished second in the Second Division, one point behind Oldham Athletic, who pipped them to the title on the last day of the season. Oldham were the season's top scorers in the division with 83 goals. 

West Ham finished the season with the meanest defence, conceding 34 goals. The second meanest defence belonged to 7th place Middlesbrough, containing Colin Cooper and Tony Mowbray, which conceded 47 goals. West Ham's two games against Middlesbrough ended in 0–0 draws.

West Ham also enjoyed their best FA Cup run since the triumph of 1980, reaching the semi-finals where they were beaten 4–0 by Nottingham Forest, denying them a Wembley final with local rivals Tottenham Hotspur who went on to win the trophy.

Trevor Morley was West Ham's leading scorer for 1990–91, with 12 goals in the league and 17 in all competitions, while Frank McAvennie showed full fitness after a long term injury by scoring 10 goals in the league (11 in all competitions) to finish the campaign as the club's second top scorer.

Results
West Ham United's score comes first

Football League First Division

FA Cup

League Cup

Squad

References

1990-91
1990–91 Football League Second Division by team
1990 sports events in London
1991 sports events in London